Westhouses and Blackwell railway station is a former railway station in Westhouses, and Blackwell, Derbyshire on the Derbyshire border west of Mansfield. The line served as a junction for both the modern-day Erewash Valley Line and a branch line to Pleasley West.

History
Not much is recorded about the station other than it was opened in 1881. The station building was of typical Midland Railway build and closed to passenger services to Pleasley in 1930. The station closed on 2 January 1967, and nothing remains of the station. The line remains open to services on the Erewash Valley Line. The branch to Pleasley is now the Silverhill Trail.

References

External links
 RAILSCOT | Westhouses And Blackwell
 Westhouses_&_Blackwell_Station
 https://picturethepast.org.uk/image-themes/railways.html?pageindex=2

Disused railway stations in Derbyshire
Railway stations in Derbyshire
Former Midland Railway stations
Railway stations in Great Britain opened in 1881
Railway stations in Great Britain closed in 1967